Baseball was contested at the 1982 Central American and Caribbean Games in Havana, Cuba.

References
 

1982 Central American and Caribbean Games
1982
1982
Central American and Caribbean Games